This is a list of the first minority male lawyer(s) and judge(s) in New Hampshire. It includes the year in which the men were admitted to practice law (in parentheses). Also included are those who achieved other distinctions, such becoming the first in their state to graduate from law school or become a political figure.

Firsts in New Hampshire's history

Lawyer 

 First African American male: William Henry Johnson (1865)

State judges 
First African American male (justice of the peace): Wentworth Cheswell in 1805  
First Jewish American male (probate court): Harry Lichman during the 1940s 
 First Jewish American male (municipal court): Bernard Snierson during the 1940s  
 First Jewish American male (superior court): Philip Hollman in 1987  
First African American male: Ivorey Cobb

Federal judges 
 First Jewish American male (United States District Court for the District of New Hampshire): Norman H. Stahl in 1990

Political office 

 First Jewish American male (congressional representative): Paul Hodes in 2007

See also 
 List of first minority male lawyers and judges in the United States

Other topics of interest 

 List of first women lawyers and judges in the United States
 List of first women lawyers and judges in New Hampshire

References 

 
Minority, New Hampshire, first
Minority, New Hampshire, first
Legal history of New Hampshire
Lists of people from New Hampshire
New Hampshire lawyers